Cataño may refer to:

Places
Cataño, Puerto Rico, a municipality
Cataño, Humacao, Puerto Rico, a barrio
Cataño barrio-pueblo, a barrio